The Grace Gospel Chapel is an LGBT friendly Evangelical Christian church located in the Ballard neighborhood of Seattle, Washington. The church was founded ca. 1977 by Vic Van Campen.

See also
LGBT-affirming Christian denominations

References

External links

1977 establishments in Washington (state)
Ballard, Seattle
Chapels in the United States
Churches in Seattle
Culture of Seattle
Evangelical churches in Washington (state)
LGBT churches in the United States